Ivanna Lemaître (1893-1973) was a Russian painter and mosaicist.

Early life 
Lemaître was born in Saint Petersburg, Russia and died in Nice, France. She was  exiled to Paris during the Bolshevik Revolution in 1917. She studied to become a painter and mosaicist in Montmartre, Rue de la Chaumière.

Career 
She married André Hubert Lemaître, a prominent artist in fresco painting and often worked side by side with him to fulfill commissions from Parisian patrons and state orders. Their most renowned frescos include work from the church of Meudon (1927), the salon of Marechal Lyautey at the Colonial Exhibition of 1931, and at the Palace of the Golden Door (Palais de la Porte Dorée).

During the German occupation of France in WWII, Lemaître moved to the French Riviera. She worked along the coast from Cannes to Monaco painting portraits of her friends Jean Cocteau, Andre Gide, Francois Mauriac and Serge Lifar, and other French writers and artists.

Ivanna Lemaître was buried in a Russian cemetery in Nice, France.

Style and motifs 
Lemaitre's style includes media such as mosaic, ink, oil, and watercolor. Her frequent subjects were villages and chapels in the country, views of the Mediterranean and mythology.

Asian myths and religious teachings about the Buddha, Krishna, and Confucius are common motifs in her work. Her panels would include scenes from the lives of these figures along with the music, theater, and culture of the Far East. Lemaître drew upon non-Christian religions little understood by the European public. She often referring to the "inscrutable Orient" in her paintings. She incorporated images of the primordial elements fire, water, and earth, all celebrated in Asian beliefs.

Frescoes by the Lemaîtres showcased a pantheon of oriental figures on the walls which gave the contributions of the Far East a full, relatively accurate description compared to the Orientalist conventions adopted by painters such as Delacroix, Ingres, and Renoir. The Lemaîtres sought to present Eastern religion without the typical, exotic symbols or excessive stylization of Art Deco.

Principal Works 

 1925 : Monastery of the Recollets in Toulouse
 1927 : Church of Meudon (faces of Jean Cocteau, Jacques Maritain, etc.)
 1931 : Salon of Maréchal Lyautey for the Colonial Exposition, Porte Dorée
 1935 : Frescoes for the scholar group Davout in Paris
 1937 : Face of the pavillon of the Maroquinerie Française de l'Exposition Universelle in 1937, Paris
 1937 : Maroufle canvases for the School of Arts and Works in Paris
 1962 : Sanctuary of Sacré-Coeur in Nice : monumental fresco in mosaic (50 square meters) ornamenting the triumphal arc
 1963 : Two mosaics in hommage to Jean Médecin and Jean Cocteau at La Porte Fausse, Vieux-Nice
 1965 : Mosaics for the Savings Bank of Nice
 1968 : Panels in mosaic for a school in Arles
 1968 : Mosaics ornamenting the face of the gym of Eucalyptus in Nice
 1973 : School of Drancy, mural decorations completed by her son Jean Lemaître after her death.
 Mosaics for multiple buildings in Nice, notably the Centenaire and the Michelet.

References

External links 

 
 
 
 
 
 
 
 

1893 births
1973 deaths
Painters from Saint Petersburg
Soviet painters
Soviet emigrants to France
Russian exiles
People from Nice
Mosaic artists
Russian portrait painters
Russian women painters
20th-century French women artists
French women painters
Russian watercolorists
French portrait painters
Burials in France
Women watercolorists